Kevin Müller (born 20 July 1988 in Magdeburg) is a German slalom canoeist who has competed at the international level since 2004, exclusively in the C2 class alongside his twin brother Kai.

He won two medals in the C2 team event at the ICF Canoe Slalom World Championships with a silver in 2015 and a bronze in 2010. He also won a silver and three bronzes in the same event at the European Championships.

References

External links 

 Kevin MÜLLER at CanoeSlalom.net

1988 births
Living people
Sportspeople from Magdeburg
German male canoeists
Medalists at the ICF Canoe Slalom World Championships